The men's 1000 m competition in speed skating  at the 2022 Winter Olympics will be held on 18 February, at the National Speed Skating Oval ("Ice Ribbon") in Beijing. Thomas Krol of the Netherlands won the event, it was his first Olympic gold medal. Laurent Dubreuil of Canada won the silver medal, his first Olympic medal. Håvard Holmefjord Lorentzen of Norway won bronze.

The reigning champion, Kjeld Nuis, qualified for the Olympics, but will not be able to defend his title as he did not qualify for this distance. The 2018 silver medalist, Håvard Holmefjord Lorentzen, qualified, as did the bronze medalist, Kim Tae-yun. Kai Verbij is the 2021 World Single Distances champion at the 1000m distance. The silver medalist and the world record holder is Pavel Kulizhnikov. Thomas Krol was leading the 2021–22 ISU Speed Skating World Cup at the 1000m distance with four races completed before the Olympics, followed by Nuis and Holmefjord Lorentzen. Krol skated the season best time, 1:06.44 in Salt Lake City on 5 December 2021.

Piotr Michalski in pair 4 was the first skater out of 1:09 and took an early lead. Only in pair 13 Krol and Holmefjord Lorentzen both improved his time. Krol became the first skater to go below 1:08, with two pairs to go. The winner of pair 14, Ning Zhongyan, had the time just 0.04 worse than Michalski's. In the last pair, Laurent Dubreuil had the second overall time, shifting Michalski off the podium.

Qualification

A total of 30 entry quotas were available for the event, with a maximum of three athletes per NOC. The first 20 athletes qualified through their performance at the 2021–22 ISU Speed Skating World Cup, while the last ten earned quotas by having the best times among athletes not already qualified. A country could only earn the maximum three spots through the World Cup rankings.

The qualification time for the event (1:10.50) was released on July 1, 2021, and was unchanged from 2018. Skaters had the time period of July 1, 2021 – January 16, 2022 to achieve qualification times at valid International Skating Union (ISU) events.

Records
Prior to this competition, the existing world, Olympic and track records were as follows.

Results
The races were started at 16:30.

References

Men's speed skating at the 2022 Winter Olympics